Teplý  (feminine form Teplá ) is a Czech surname. It is derived from the Czech–Slovak word teplý for "warm."

People with the surname include:

 Jiří Teplý (born 1962), Czech cross country skier
 Josef Teplý (1902–unknown), Czech middle-distance runner
 Michal Teplý (born 2001), Czech ice hockey player
 Oldřich Teplý (born 1940), Czech speed skater
 Viktor Teplý (born 1990), Czech sailor

See also
 
 

Czech-language surnames
Surnames from nicknames